A mezzo soprano or mezzo (English: /ˈmɛtsoʊ/; Italian: [ˈmɛddzo soˈpraːno]; meaning "half soprano") is a type of classical female singing voice whose vocal range lies between the soprano and the contralto voice types.

Mezzo soprano may also refer to:
 Mezzo Soprano (horse) (2000–2013), an American-bred Thoroughbred racehorse and broodmare
 Mezzo-soprano clef, a C-clef on the second line of the stave
 Mezzo-soprano saxophone or F alto saxophone, only produced in 1928 and 1929